José Moreno Justicia (born 1960), better known as Pepe Justicia, is a Spanish flamenco guitarist from Bélmez de la Moraleda, Jaén. A concert player and teacher, he got into flamenco aged 14, inspired by Paco de Lucía. His playing style is reminiscent of traditional flamenco from Jerez de la Frontera, where he resides since 1987.

References

1960 births
Living people
Spanish flamenco guitarists
People from the Province of Jaén (Spain)